Partner was a Macedonian brand of cigarettes that was owned and manufactured by Makedonija Tabak.

History
The brand was founded after the end of World War II in the Socialist Republic of Macedonia and was one of the few Yugoslavian brands that were sold outside of Yugoslavia, which were the Soviet Union, Poland, Finland and Japan. While Partner wasn't as known or popular as Drina, Jadran or Lovćen, it still sold well within socialist Macedonia. However, during the breakup of Yugoslavia, the company suffered and eventually the brand ceased to exist after Macedonia became its own country. Due to the fact that this brand looked and sounded foreign compared to similar brands sold in Yugoslavia, it was always seen as the "odd" and "foreign" brand on the market.

Packaging
The pack has a white-blue pattern, with two horses holding a coat of arms with two flower-like symbols. Underneath, the words "Partner Filter" is written in white, surrounded with a red banner. Above and underneath it, the words "king size" and "20 cigarettes" are written in white letters.

Markets
Partner was mainly sold in the Socialist Republic of Macedonia, but also was or still is sold in the Socialist Federal Republic of Yugoslavia, Republic of Macedonia, Poland, Hungarian People's Republic, Croatia, Latvia, Lithuania, Russia.

See also
 Tobacco smoking
 Drina (cigarette)
 Elita (cigarette)
 Filter 57 (cigarette)
 Jadran (cigarette)
 Laika (cigarette)
 Lovćen (cigarette)
 Morava (cigarette)
 Smart (cigarette)
 Time (cigarette)
 Sobranie
 Jin Ling
 LD (cigarette)
 Walter Wolf (cigarette)

References

Cigarette brands